is a tram stop and interchange station in Ukyo-ku, Kyoto, Japan.

Station layout 
The station consists of four platforms at ground level, with a concourse. Platforms 1 and 2 are for through-services on the Arashiyama line. The platforms and concourse are wheelchair accessible, and have ticket barriers.

Adjacent stations

References

External links
 
 

Stations of Keifuku Electric Railroad
Railway stations in Japan opened in 1926